Chrysosporium is a genus of hyaline hyphomycetes fungi in the family Onygenaceae.

Chrysosporium colonies are moderately fast-growing, flat, white to tan to beige in color; they often have a powdery or granular surface texture. Hyaline, one-celled (ameroconidia) are produced directly on vegetative hyphae by non-specialized conidiogenous cells. Conidia are typically pyriform to clavate with truncate bases (6 to 7 by 3.5 to 4 um) and are formed either intercalary (arthroconidia), laterally (often on pedicels), or terminally.


Clinical significance
Species of Chrysosporium are occasionally isolated from skin and nail scrapings, especially from feet, but, because they are common soil saprotrophs, they are usually considered as contaminants. There are about 22 species of Chrysosporium, several are keratinophilic with some also being thermotolerant, and cultures may closely resemble some dermatophytes, especially Trichophyton mentagrophytes, and some strains may also resemble cultures of Histoplasma and Blastomyces.

Chrysosporium has been identified as an emerging infectious disease, first in Canada affecting reptiles at around 1995. It infected eastern massasauga rattlesnakes (Sistrurus catenatus catenatus). By 2011, it had affected northern copperheads (Agkistrodon contortrix mokasen), timber rattlesnakes, black rat snakes, black racer snakes and eastern garter snakes in New Jersey.

Species
 Chrysosporium alboluteolum 
 Chrysosporium alvearium 
 Chrysosporium articulatum 
 Chrysosporium barabicum 
 Chrysosporium botryoides 
 Chrysosporium carmichaelii 
 Chrysosporium chiropterorum 
 Chrysosporium christchurchicum 
 Chrysosporium clavisporum 
 Chrysosporium crassitunicatum 
 Chrysosporium echinulatum 
 Chrysosporium europae 
 Chrysosporium fermentatitritici 
 Chrysosporium filiforme 
 Chrysosporium fluviale 
 Chrysosporium foetidum 
 Chrysosporium georgiae 
 Chrysosporium globiferum 
 Chrysosporium gourii 
 Chrysosporium guizhouense 
 Chrysosporium hirundinis 
 Chrysosporium hispanicum 
 Chrysosporium holmii 
 Chrysosporium hubeiense 
 Chrysosporium inops 
 Chrysosporium jingzhouense 
 Chrysosporium kreiselii 
 Chrysosporium kuzurovianum 
 Chrysosporium leigongshanense 
 Chrysosporium linfenense 
 Chrysosporium lobatum 
 Chrysosporium lucknowense 
 Chrysosporium magnisporum 
 Chrysosporium medium 
 Chrysosporium mephiticum 
 Chrysosporium merdarium 
 Chrysosporium minus 
 Chrysosporium minutisporosum 
 Chrysosporium oceanitis 
 Chrysosporium olivaceum 
 Chrysosporium osteophilum 
 Chrysosporium pannicola 
 Chrysosporium pollaceii 
 Chrysosporium pseudomerdarium 
 Chrysosporium pyriforme 
 Chrysosporium qinghaiense 
 Chrysosporium queenslandicum 
 Chrysosporium sanyaense 
 Chrysosporium sepedonioides 
 Chrysosporium sepedonium 
 Chrysosporium serratum 
 Chrysosporium shanxiense 
 Chrysosporium siglerae 
 Chrysosporium sinense 
 Chrysosporium speluncarum 
 Chrysosporium spinosum 
 Chrysosporium spinulosum 
 Chrysosporium submersum 
 Chrysosporium sulphureum 
 Chrysosporium synchronum 
 Chrysosporium tropicum 
 Chrysosporium tuberculatum 
 Chrysosporium undulatum 
 Chrysosporium vallenarense 
 Chrysosporium zonatum

References

Animal fungal diseases
Mycosis-related cutaneous conditions
Deuteromycota
Onygenales
Taxa described in 1833
Taxa named by August Carl Joseph Corda
Eurotiomycetes genera